Prince Ahmed Ali Ahmedzai is a Pakistani politician who was a Member of the Provincial Assembly of Balochistan, from August 2013 to May 2018.

Early life and education
He was born on 3 February 1968 in Karachi.

He has done graduation.

Political career
He ran for the seat of the Provincial Assembly of the Balochistan as a candidate of Pakistan Muslim League (N) (PML-N) from Constituency PB-35 (Lasbela-II) in 1993 Pakistani general election but was unsuccessful. He received 7,598 votes and lost the seat to Mohammad Saleh Bhutani.

He was elected to the Provincial Assembly of Balochistan as a candidate of PML-N from Constituency PB-44 Lasbela-I in by-election held in August 2013.

On 3 January 2018, he resigned as advisor to Chief Minister of Balochistan. On 13 January, he was inducted into the provincial Balochistan cabinet of Chief Minister Abdul Quddus Bizenjo and was made Provincial Minister of Balochistan for Science and Information.

References

Living people
Balochistan MPAs 2013–2018
1968 births
Pakistan Muslim League (N) politicians